Bulan dan mek is one of the traditional Thai desserts inspired by royal songs in the reign of King Rama II of Chakri Dynasty, 1767-1824. It is a small  dessert in which the center is a circular dimple with a yellow color and a bluish-purple surrounding skin.

History 
Bulan dan mek is a royal Thai dessert that has been invented. It means the moon floating among the clouds. The appearance of the dessert uses butterfly pea flower juice instead of the color of the clouds at night, and the word "bulan" means the moon will use an egg yolk placed in the middle to imitate the moon floating prominently in the night sky.

Bulan dan mek was inspired by the song "Bulan Loi Luean" which is a royal song written from the dream story of King Rama II, 1767-1824. According to the history of this song, it is said that after he was lightning fiddle until late at night, he fell asleep. He dreamed that he had gone to a very beautiful place. The full moon gradually drifts closer along with the clairvoyant sound. His Highness looked and listened to the beautiful music. Then, the moon gradually drifted away in the sky, the sound of music gradually faded away. Upon waking up, the sound of the music in the dream still rings in his ears. The king had court musicians arrange, remember the piece, and bestowed the name of the song "Bulan Loi Luean"

Ingredients 
The ingredients of bulan dan mek are divided into 2 main parts. The first part is the flour mixture, namely rice flour, arrowroot powder or alternatively tapioca starch, butterfly pea flower juice or use food coloring, caster sugar, coconut milk, and salt may be added. The second part is the ingredients of the filling such as egg yolk, sugar, salt, and coconut milk can be added to make custard filling or use thong yot paste instead. Bulan dan mek may have slightly different ingredients in each area. But using the standard part is rice flour, sugar, coconut milk, and egg. All recipes can be used to make bulan dan mek as well.

Flour mixture

 60 grams of rice flour

 Arrowroot powder 1 ½ tablespoon
 70 grams of water
 40 grams of caster sugar
 Butterfly pea flower juice, boiled 170 g.

Ingredients of the filling

 1 egg yolk
 14 grams of white sugar
 ¼ tablespoon of salt
 30 grams of coconut milk

Equipment 
Originally, bulan dan mek was baked in pottery cups. It requires specific equipment to make. In the past, they used Sangkhalok ceramic wares, which were small cups made from pottery called pinwheel cups. Pinwheel cups come in a variety of sizes. Slightly different sizes are considered "standard" in different countries. Nowadays, we can use other cups that are small and heat resistant and can be baked in a steamer instead.

 Small pinwheel cup (can use a small, heat-resistant cup)

 Steamer
 Measuring cup
 Bowl
 Tablespoon
 Teaspoon
 Spatula
 Egg whisk
 Spoon

Recipes 
Bulan dan mek recipes have similarities, different in the filling, steaming time and fire control.

 The process starts by steaming a cup of the pinwheel in boiling water for about 10 minutes until the cup is hot.
 Mix rice flour, arrowroot powder, sugar and knead with water little by little to combine, then filtered to get a smooth texture.
 Mix butterfly pea flower juice with the flour mixture. Heat the pinwheel cup first, then slowly pour in the flour.
 After pouring the flour mixture into the pinwheel cup. Cover the lid and steam in boiling water for about 2 minutes.
 Desserts will have a dent in the middle. Wait until the dough sticks slightly to the edge of the cup. Squeeze or drop coconut milk into the hole. Bring to steam for another 1 minute.
 Drop the filling mixture (from the egg yolks, sugar, and salt together) in the center by scraping the bottom of the spoon each time. Let there be no egg yolks attached. Because it will drip onto the edge of the dessert, making it unattractive.
 Then steam for another 5 minutes or until cooked homogeneously. In the case of using thong yot instead of chicken eggs continue steaming until thong yot push itself up above the dough.
 Set aside until cool. Gently remove bulan dan mek from the pinwheel cup.

Belief 
Bulan dan mek is also used to take a chance guess about job duties. It is often predicted from the drop of the yolk or bulan horoscope. If it comes out beautifully round may be promoted. But if it is distorted, it means that the job will not be good.

Shops 
Bulan dan mek is a royal Thai dessert that is quite difficult to find. Fortunately, there are still some shops that sell bulan dan mek. Most of them are shops located at tourist attractions.such as Nannaphat at Khlong Suan 100 Years Market, Chachoengsao, Sane cafe & workshop, Ban Aom Thai dessert, Klang Pa homemade restaurant, etc.

References

External links 

 Sangdad Publishing's Food Team, Bulan dan mek’s recipe, Sangdad Publishing, 2018, Krua. Retrieved 23 September 2021
 Kitchen&Home team, Thai dessert beautiful name according to the royal recipe, Sane.workshop, 2018, Kitchen magazine. Retrieved 23 September 2021
 Flash, Royal dessert, beautiful like a shining moon, The wisdom Lifestyle activities, 2016, Mgronline. Retrieved 23 September 2021
 Love Thailand’s team, royal dessert ancient recipe, 2021, tourist articles, Thailand love group. Retrieved 23 September 2021
 "'บุหลันดั้นเมฆ' ตลาดคลองสวน ขนมโบราณที่ลูกหลานยังไม่ลืม". https://www.posttoday.com. Retrieved 2021-11-04.

Thai desserts and snacks